Atlas is the fourth studio album by Australian metalcore band Parkway Drive. It was recorded in Los Angeles, California, and released on 26 October 2012 through Resist and Epitaph Records. The album was produced by Matt Hyde.

At the J Awards of 2012, the album was nominated for Australian Album of the Year.

Release and promotion
On 9 September 2012, Parkway Drive released the album's first single, "Dark Days" along with a music video. On 17 September, Parkway Drive released a 10-second teaser of "Old Ghost / New Regrets" in an interview with Winston McCall on the ABC radio program, The Doctor. On 16 October, "Old Ghost / New Regrets" was released by Parkway Drive through the Epitaph Records YouTube channel.

On 23 October, the full album became available to stream on the Epitaph Records YouTube channel. The album was released on 26 October 2012 through Epitaph Records. The band first started touring in support of the album in Europe between 13 November 2012 and 1 December 2012 with opening bands Emmure, The Word Alive and Structures. On 13 December, they embarked on their second album release tour, to New Zealand and Australia. The band performed as part of Warped Tour Australia in November and December 2013.

Critical reception

Atlas received generally positive reviews from critics. At Metacritic, which assigns a normalised rating out of 100 to reviews from mainstream critics, the album has an average score of 73 out of 100 based on 6 reviews, indicating "generally favorable reviews". Fred Thomas from AllMusic commented on the album's use of instruments not generally used in metalcore, saying, "The album's depth and openness to straying away from typical devices of the genre make Atlas one of the more engaging and thought-provoking metalcore releases amid a sea of the interchangeable riffs and howls of other bands."

Commercial performance
Atlas debuted at No. 3 on the Australian ARIA albums chart and achieved an ARIA Gold certification for 35,000 shipments in January 2013. In the US, it charted at No. 32 on the Billboard 200, and has sold 63,000 copies in the US as of September 2015.

At the end of the year the album was featured on a few end of year lists. It reached 25 of 101 in Kerrang!.

Track listing

Personnel

 Parkway Drive
 Winston McCall – lead vocals
 Jeff Ling – lead guitar
 Luke "Pig" Kilpatrick – rhythm guitar
 Jia "Pie" O'Connor – bass
 Ben "Gaz" Gordon – drums

 Additional musicians
 Bruce Mann – trumpet on "Blue and the Grey"
 Daniel "The Duke" Alexander – piano on "Atlas"
 Mariah Green – cello on "Sparks" and "Atlas"
 Alison Belle – violin on "Sparks" and "Atlas"
 DJ Snagtoof – turntables on "The Slow Surrender"
 Tim McAfee Lewis, Skip Jennings, Arnae Baston and Reirani Taurima – vocals on "Sparks", "The River", "Atlas" and "Blue and the Grey"

 Additional personnel
 Matt Hyde – production, engineering, mixing, mastering
 Chris Rakestraw – engineering
 Sahir Hanif – drum technician
 Richard Baron – string arrangements
 Dugan Cruz – assistant production, vocal arrangements
 NASA – album cover
 Alex Ormerod and Bec Kilpatrick – photography, booklet photos
 Callum Preston – art direction, layout

Charts

Weekly charts

Year-end charts

Certifications

References

2012 albums
Parkway Drive albums
Epitaph Records albums
Albums produced by Matt Hyde
Resist Records albums